Volendam is a town in the Netherlands.

Volendam may also refer to:
SS Volendam, a Transatlantic ocean liner built in 1922 and scrapped in 1951
MS Volendam, a cruise ship built in 1999
 Volendam neurodegenerative disease, a type of Pontocerebellar hypoplasia
 Volendam New Year's fire, a deadly café fire in Volendam in the New Year's night of 2000-2001
 Volendam Windmill, a windmill in Holland Township, New Jersey, United States